Ethnix (stylized as Xאתני) is an Israeli pop rock band, founded in 1985 as Moskva (- "Moscow") by vocalist Zeev Nechama and keyboardist Tamir Kalinski. Their music is a mix of oriental and Western melodies. Ethnix is the oldest continuously-operating band in Israel, together since 1985.

History
Originally, Ze'ev Nechama and Tamir Kalinski were joined by drummer/guitarist/keyboardist Yoed Nevo, and they composed their first album, "Ethnix", which was released in June 1990. The album leaned towards rock, with noticeable musical influence from the band "Moskva", but the band soon began expanding in other directions, specifically combining "ethnic" (oriental) and Western, which came to define the character of the band and is reflected in its name. The name was given by Roni Bar'on and Dror Kalisky, the manager of the band, on the grounds that the previous name wasn't "intriguing" enough.

The first single released as Ethnix was "Ein Le'an Lalechet" ("There is nowhere to go") in October 1989, followed by "Moshita", "Tzipor Midbar" and "Shnayim Shnayim" in 1990. These songs placed Ethnix on the map, and the band became top-selling and successful. Under the pressure of concert performances, Yoed left the band, to be replaced by guitarist Gil Alon and drummer Gal Hadani. In 1996, guitarist/bassist Yoram Poizner joined, completing the now stylish and diverse band. Albums include elements of rock, pop, dance, Mediterranean, and more. Ze'ev and Tamir, the main composers, created and produced for many more artists over the years, including well-known star Eyal Golan, for whom they wrote three albums which helped propel him and the Mediterranean style to popularity. Other artists they have composed for include Sharon Haziz, Yehudah Keisar, Hagmalim, Izkis and Hayalei Hanekama.

On 2 July 2011, Ethnix had an open concert in Caesarea. During the show it was announced that the guitar player, Gil Alon,  was leaving the band and would be replaced by Gilad Pasternak.

Albums
1990 - "Ethnix" (Helicon)
1991 - "Masala" (Helicon)
1992 - "Yelalat Tan" (Helicon)
1993 - "Adam V'Nahash" (Helicon)
1994 - "Atah" (Helicon)
1995 - "Haosef shel Ethnix" - the first collection (Helicon)
1996 - "Pop" (Helicon)
1998 - "Bruchim Habaim L'Yisrael" (Helicon)
1999 - "Morris" (Sultan)
2000 - "Hamofa Hameshutaf" - Live concert with Eyal Golan (Sultan)
2000 - "Maximum Ethnix" - the second collection (Helicon)
2001 - "Baderech Shelach" (Sultan)
2002 - "13" (Sultan)
2005 - "America" (Sultan)
2011 - "Ga'aguim" (Sultan)
2012 - "Ahavat Chinam" (Sultan)
2015 - "HaTov Korah" (Helicon)
2017 - "Batouach" (Helicon)

References

External links
Ethnix official website

Israeli ethnic musical groups
Israeli rock music groups
Israeli pop music groups
Dance groups
Pop rock groups
Synthpop groups
Musical groups established in 1984